The Ljubljana Slovene National Theatre Opera and Ballet, or shortly Ljubljana SNG Opera and Ballet, is Slovenia's national opera and ballet company. Its seat is the Ljubljana Opera House at 1 Župančič Street in Ljubljana. The Ljubljana Slovene National Theatre Opera and Ballet was founded in 1918. It is now a subsection of the Slovene National Drama Theatre in Ljubljana ( and has about 50 dancers. Since 2013, its director has been the lawyer Peter Sotošek Štular, and its artistic director the opera stage director Rocc (Rok Rappl).

History
The history of opera in Slovenia goes back to Giuseppe Clemente de Bonomi's Il Tamerlano in 1732. Operas were at first staged in the Provincial Theatre Building at Congress Square, at the site of today's National Philharmonics Building. The Ljubljana Opera House was built in 1892. The Provincial Theatre (the predecessor of the Ljubljana SNG Opera and Ballet, until 191 shared premises with the German Theatre, which then moved to the Ljubljana Drama Theatre.

In 1918, the company was enlarged with its own orchestra and a professional ballet group. The conductor Mirko Polič performed Western repertoire as well as Slavic works such as the ballets of the Bulgarian composer Pancho Vladigerov and works of the Slovene composer Marij Kogoj. The current repertoire includes Massenet, Rossini, Mozart, etc.

See also
 Maribor Slovene National Theatre (SNG Maribor)
 Nova Gorica Slovene National Theatre (SNG Nova Gorica)
 Ljubljana City Theatre (Mestno gledališče ljubljansko, MGL)
 Slovenian Philharmonic
 Cankar Hall, Ljubljana, 10 Prešeren Street
 Križanke Summer Theatre, Ljubljana, 28 Miklosich Street
 Ljubljana Castle, Estate Hall concerts

References

External links
Official site

Ballet companies
Opera companies
Music organizations based in Slovenia
Ballet in Slovenia
Opera in Slovenia
Theatres in Ljubljana
Arts organizations established in 1918
1918 establishments in Europe